Armel Bella-Kotchap (born 11 December 2001) is a German professional footballer who plays as a centre-back for Premier League club Southampton and the Germany national team.

Club career

VfL Bochum 
In July 2018, Bella-Kotchap joined VfL Bochum professional team 2018–19 summer training camp. In March 2019, Bella-Kotchap signed his first professional contract with VfL Bochum. He made his professional debut for Bochum in the 2. Bundesliga on 28 April 2019, starting in the away match against Erzgebirge Aue.

Southampton 
On 21 June 2022, Bella-Kotchap joined Southampton on a four-year deal. Having established himself as a regular starter at centre-back, Bella-Kotchap dislocated his shoulder in a collision during the 1–1 draw with West Ham United on 16 October. As a result, he was expected to be out of action for several weeks.

International career
Bella-Kotchap began his youth international career with the Germany under-18 team, making his debut on 15 November 2018 in a friendly match against Cyprus, which finished as a 1–0 win.

On 15 September 2022, Bella-Kotchap was included in the German senior squad for the first time. He made his debut as a late substitute on 26 September in a 3–3 draw with England. In November 2022, he was selected in the German squad for the 2022 FIFA World Cup in Qatar.

Personal life
Bella-Kotchap was born in Paris, France, and is the son of former Cameroon international Cyrille Florent Bella.

Career statistics

Club

International

Honours
VfL Bochum
 2. Bundesliga: 2020–21

References

External links
 
 
 
 

2001 births
Living people
Footballers from Paris
German footballers 
French emigrants to Germany
Cameroonian emigrants to Germany
German people of Cameroonian descent 
German sportspeople of African descent
Naturalized citizens of Germany
Citizens of Cameroon through descent
Association football central defenders
Germany youth international footballers
Germany under-21 international footballers
Germany international footballers
Bundesliga players
2. Bundesliga players
VfL Bochum players
Southampton F.C. players
German expatriate sportspeople in England
Expatriate footballers in England
German expatriate footballers
Premier League players
2022 FIFA World Cup players